Men's football (soccer) was a Chinese National Games sport since the first edition. Women's football competition began in 1987. Since 1997, the age limit for men's teams is under-20. Two youth divisions, men's under-16 and women's under-18, were launched since the 11th National Games.

Men's tournaments

Summaries

Medal table

* = shared

Men's youth tournaments

Summaries

Medal table

Women's tournaments

Summaries

Medal table

Women's youth tournaments

Summaries

Medal table

Former tournaments

1910–1924

Medal table

1930–1935

Medal table

* = shared

All-time medal table

References
Independent site of Chinese football history 

 
Football competitions in China
Chinese National Games